Events from the year 1791 in Austria

Incumbents
 Monarch – Leopold II

Events

 
 

 
 - Treaty of Sistova

Births

Deaths

 Wolfgang Amadeus Mozart

References

 
Years of the 18th century in Austria